Joseph Musonda (born 30 May 1977) is a Zambian former professional football who played as a defender.

An accomplished and reliable defender, he plays in either full back position for the Zambia national team and centre back for his club. He is Zambia's second most capped player after Kennedy Mweene according to FIFA.

Career
Musonda was born in Kalulushi. Described by FIFA as the 'father figure' of the Zambian team, Joseph Musonda is fitter than ever and still very much a part of the nation's defence of the Africa Cup of Nations.

Having contributed so much to Zambia's historic win in the 2012 Africa Cup of Nations it was cruel that Joseph Musonda's final v Ivory Coast should be cut short by injury after just 11 minutes. Despite this, Musonda was finally able to celebrate what was his 100th match for Zambia when his team went on to win 8–7 on penalties. Musonda injured his ankle making a vital intervention against Gervinho who was bearing down on goal and he left the field in visible distress. Despite his uncompromising defending, Joseph Musonda is considered to be one of the gentlemen of the Zambia national team, so it was no surprise when his opponent that day, Didier Drogba, came to comfort him as he was brought off the field. Manager Herve Renard would later carry him up to receive his winners medal.

Musonda made a much quicker recovery from that ankle injury than was expected demonstrating his powers of recovery and he was soon playing again for Golden Arrows in South Africa. Indeed, in June 2012 the club tied him to a three-year contract extension that will take Musonda to 38 years of age. At the time, Joseph Musonda turned down the opportunity to play in the United Arab Emirates on a lucrative contract.

Joseph Musonda was part of the Zambian 2006 African Nations Cup team. He was also picked in the 2008 squad for the AFCON and Zambia were eliminated in the group stage before being part of the 2010 squad that made it to the Quarter Finals of the competition eventually losing to Nigeria in a penalty shoot-out.

In his native Zambia, Musonda was a two times winner of the league championship with Nkana FC in 1999 and 2001.

Post-playing career
On 12 November 2019, it was confirmed, that 42-year old Musonda had retired after more than 20 years of playing professional football and would continue as a physical coach at Nkana, signing a two-year deal with the club.

Honours
Zambia
Africa Cup of Nations: 2012

See also
List of footballers with 100 or more caps

References

External links
 
 
 Joseph Musonda - Century of International Appearances RSSSF

1977 births
Living people
Zambian footballers
Zambia international footballers
Zambian expatriate footballers
Zambian expatriate sportspeople in South Africa
2006 Africa Cup of Nations players
2008 Africa Cup of Nations players
2010 Africa Cup of Nations players
2012 Africa Cup of Nations players
2013 Africa Cup of Nations players
Free State Stars F.C. players
Lamontville Golden Arrows F.C. players
Polokwane City F.C. players
Nkana F.C. players
Expatriate soccer players in South Africa
Association football defenders
FIFA Century Club
Zanaco F.C. players
ZESCO United F.C. players
Africa Cup of Nations-winning players